The York Virtuosi were an informal group of antiquarians, artists and natural philosophers who gathered initially around Martin Lister in York between 1670 and 1683. 

They were "at the height of their powers" towards the end of the century, and in this group may be seen the roots of the Yorkshire Philosophical Society (founded 1822) which followed the example of newly founded societies in Leeds, Sheffield and Hull. 

Among the group were:

Martin Lister (c.1638–1712), zoologist, Fellow of the Royal Society and eventually its vice-president
Ralph Thoresby (1658–1725), antiquarian and topographer
Henry Gyles (1645–1709) the glass painter;
Thomas Mann, maker of compasses and waywisers
Joshua Mann, his brother
Francis Place (1647–1728), a topographical artist who had apartments in the King's Manor
William Lodge (1649–1689), engraver and printmaker
John Lambert (c.1640–1701), son of John Lambert (general)
Jacques Parmentier (1658–1730), a French painter
Thomas Kirke (1650–1706), mathematician
John Etty (1634–1709), architect, whose memorial in All Saint's, North Street, states "By strength of his own genius and application he had acquired great knowedge of Mathematicks, especially Geometry & Architecture in all its parts far beyond any of his co-tempores in the City". He was the father of William Etty.

On the periphery of the group were
Moses Ashenden, physician
James Smith, (antiquarian), nephew of Henry Gyles
George Plaxton, Rector of Barwick in Elmet
Miles Gale, Rector of Keighley
Cyril Arthington, (c.1666–1720) Rector of Adel and an FRS.

References

Philosophical societies in the United Kingdom
17th century in England
History of York
17th century in Yorkshire